"Ring a Bell" is a song by Japanese musician Bonnie Pink. Initially released in English as a digital single on April 16, 2008, the song was re-released in Japanese as a full-length single, retitled , on August 6, 2008. The song was used as the theme song for the Namco game Tales of Vesperia, with the English version of the song used for the game's overseas release.

The song was one of Bonnie Pink's most commercially successful singles, with the Japanese-language version selling over 250,000 digital downloads in Japan, becoming Platinum certified by the RIAJ.

Track listings

Digital download
Ring a Bell - 4:07

Physical single
Kane o Narashite – 4:07
Pump it Up! – 4:05
A Perfect Sky (Björn Remix) – 3:31
 – 4:09
Pump it Up! (Instrumental) – 4:05

Chart rankings

Sales and certifications

Release history

References 

2008 singles
2008 songs
Bonnie Pink songs
Tales (video game series) music
Warner Music Japan singles